Periscepsia handlirschi is a species of fly in the family Tachinidae.

Distribution
France, Italy, Spain and Switzerland

References

Diptera of Europe
Dexiinae
Insects described in 1891